International Christian School is an English language, Christian independent school in Hong Kong near Shek Mun station. Opened on 1 September 1992, it provides education at all grades from kindergarten to the senior secondary levels.

Admissions
ICS admits about 20% of its applicant pool annually. Both local and international admissions are based on a two-to-three-hour-long exam that assesses applicants' verbal, math, and problem-solving skills, and an interview. The Dean of Admissions manages the competitive admissions every year.

Curriculum
International Christian School (ICS) is based on an American curriculum. ICS students are evaluated through MAP testing during elementary, and PSAT and SAT in high school. In high school, students have gradually increasing freedom in choosing their courses. However, students must obtain a required number of credits each year, as well as a minimum number of credits in certain core disciplines in order to graduate. International Christian School offers Advanced Placement (AP) courses in art, various areas of science, mathematics, English language and literature, and Chinese.

Fine and performing arts
Music and art classes are taught to elementary students. Additionally, sports, art, and drama classes are offered throughout middle and high school.

General music classes are taken up to Grade 4, whereas in Grade 5 they are replaced with band, and strings. Both are then compulsory until high school, where students may choose to continue taking one or both.

All middle school students are required to take art and drama classes in alternating semesters. In high school, students can choose to take art or drama.

Languages
Until Grade 7, classes in Mandarin are mandatory. Upon entering Grade 8, students can either continue taking courses in Mandarin or take classes in Spanish. However, the vast majority of students take Chinese in high school. Starting in middle school, ICS offers a wide variety of Mandarin classes to cater to the wide variety of student language proficiencies.

Bible classes
Bible classes at ICS are compulsory in all grade levels. Grade 6-7 students study the Old Testament in their Bible classes and Grade 8 students study the Gospels. Grade 9 students study the New Testament, Grade 10 students study Biblical Ethics and World Religions. Grade 11 students study Life Calling and Grade 12 students take a course on Christ and Culture for Semester 1 and Doctrine and Apologetics for Semester 2. Bible class grades count toward a student's GPA in high school and is based on the Wheaton publications.

Chapel
Student attendance at weekly chapels is mandatory. All-school assemblies occur a few times every academic year. In middle and high school, worship services are led by students worship teams.

Campuses
International Christian School was originally located at 45-47 Grampian Road in Kowloon City. After a few years, a new campus was opened in Lai Yiu. In the 2001–2002 school year, all elementary grade levels moved to a new campus in Fo Tan, which is in Sha Tin, and the secondary grade levels moved entirely to the Kowloon City campus. Until the 2007-2008 academic year, the secondary campus, which consists of middle and high school, was in Kowloon City, and the kindergarten and elementary campuses were in Fotan. In the 2007–2008 school year, the elementary and secondary campuses moved into a new building in Shek Mun, which is located near Sha Tin.

Ma On Shan Campus

Beginning in the 2012–2013 school year, the kindergarten campus is located at Chung On Estate (Heng On station of Tuen Ma line) on the ground floor of Kam Fung Court. The P1 grade, which serves as the final year of kindergarten, is located in Shek Mun, as well as the elementary school, which contains grades 1–5, the middle school, which consists of grades 6–8, and finally, the high school, which consists of grades 9-12.

Shek Mun Campus

The Shek Mun campus was constructed to represent God's hands spread out. The building is divided into two wings. The first three floors of the building are shared by both the elementary and the secondary. These floors contain most of the music rooms, the two gymnasiums, and various rooms used by the administration. The next four floors consist of general classrooms, computer labs, labs, libraries, and art rooms. Finally, the seventh floor is used to house new teachers and their families for their first year at the school. The building's floor numbers start at the ground floor, following the British system commonly used in Hong Kong.

Notable alumni
 Elliot Leung, 梁皓一, blockbuster film composer, Operation Red Sea
 Eudice Chong - Professional tennis player

References

External links 

 

International schools in Hong Kong
1992 establishments in Hong Kong
Educational institutions established in 1992